Abul Fazal Mohammad Ahsanuddin Chowdhury (1 July 1915 – 30 August 2001) was a Bengali public servant and judge who served as President of Bangladesh from 27 March 1982 to 10December 1983.

Biography
Chowdhury was born in 1915.  He graduated and obtained his LL.B. degree from Dhaka University. He joined the Bengal Civil Service (judicial) in 1942, and subsequently served as district judge in Sylhet, Rangpur and Dhaka. He was appointed Justice of the Dhaka High Court on 17 December 1968 by the then President of Pakistan, Field Marshal Ayub Khan, and later a Justice of the Appellate Division of the Supreme Court on 30 January 1974. He retired from service on 1 July 1977 after President Ziaur Rahman reduced the retirement age of judges from 65 to 62.

Politics
Following a military coup d'état in March 1982, the army chief of staff Hossain Mohammad Ershad assumed power as the chief martial law administrator, and Justice Ahsanuddin Chowdhury was made President of Bangladesh on 27 March 1982, a position which he held till 10 December 1983. Ershad then dismissed Ahsanuddin and assumed the presidency.

Social and welfare institutions
He was the chairman of Bangladesh Scouts, chairman of the management board and trustee board of Dhaka Child Hospital, chairman of National Foundation of Mental Health, chairman of the managing committee of Dhaka Law College, chairman of anjuman-i-mufidul Islam, and chairman of Dhaka High Court mazar committee. He died on 30 August 2001.

See also

References

1915 births
2001 deaths
Jatiya Party politicians
Presidents of Bangladesh
University of Dhaka alumni